The following lists events that happened during 1789 in Australia.

Leaders
Monarch - George III
Governor of New South Wales – Captain Arthur Phillip 
Governor of Norfolk Island – Philip Gidley King
Commanding officer of the colony's marine presence – Major Robert Ross

Events
 January – A convict uprising on Norfolk Island is easily crushed.
 April – An outbreak of smallpox at the Sydney Cove settlement kills many local Eora Aboriginals, including Arabanoo.
29 April – The Mutiny on the Bounty occurs; Captain William Bligh and 18 others are cast adrift.
 4 June – The first Government House is completed.
 4 June – Australia's first theatrical performance The Recruiting Officer by George Farquhar staged with convicts acting in the roles.
 12 June – Phillip leads an expedition to Broken Bay (departed from Sydney on the 6th), and discovers the Hawkesbury River.
27 June – Captain Watkin Tench and party discover the Nepean River
22 September – (Today's New South Wales) Commonly cited as the first white child or the first white female born in Australia, Rebecca Small (22 September 1789 – 30 January 1883), was born in Port Jackson, the eldest daughter of John Small a boatswain in the First Fleet which arrived at Botany Bay in January 1788. 
5 October –  The first ship built in the colony, Rose Hill Packet, begins service on the Parramatta River. 
 21 November – James Ruse, a convict, provisionally given land at Parramatta to establish Experiment Farm.
 25 November – For the purposes of understanding Aboriginal culture, Phillip captures Bennelong and Colebec.
 December – First successful harvest at Parramatta

Births
 19 January – Madame Rens, New South Wales settler and merchant (d. 1873) 
 16 March – Jared Davys, Administrator of Victoria (d. 1872) 
 1 May – George Fife Angas, Businessman and politician (d. 1879)
 29 September – Benjamin Carvosso, first Wesleyan minister to preach in Australia (d. 1854)
 November – Peter Miller Cunningham, naval surgeon and author (d. 1864)
 5 November – William Bland, Medical practitioner, surgeon and politician (d. 1868)
 date unknown
 John Bateman, Fremantle pioneer, merchant and whaler (d. 1855)
 Prosper de Mestre, merchant (d. 1844)
 Michael Fenton, first Speaker of the Tasmanian House of Assembly (d. 1874)
 Thomas Gilbert, South Australian pioneer (d. 1873)
 Robert Menli Lyon, Aboriginal advocate (d. 1874)

Deaths
 18 May – Arabanoo, cultural mediator between the British settlers and Eora Aboriginals
 December – George Austin, gardener on 
 December – James Smith, gardener on

References

 Australian Encyclopedia 6th edition Australian Geographic Terrey Hills NSW 1996 Volume 1 Chronology page 25

 
Australia
Years of the 18th century in Australia